Gorysze  is a village in the administrative district of Gmina Ciechanów, within Ciechanów County, Masovian Voivodeship, in east-central Poland. In 1975-1998 village belonged to Ciechanów Voivodeship.

The village has a population of 165.

References

Gorysze